Gülnaz Büşranur Coşkun (born 25 August 1999) is a Turkish recurve archer.

Sport career
Gülnaz Büşranur Coşkun won the silver medal in the women's team recurve event at the 2022 European Indoor Archery Championships held in Laško, Slovenia.

She won the gold medal in the women's individual recurve event at the 2022 European Archery Championships held in Munich, Germany. She also won the silver medal in the women's team recurve event.

References

Turkish female archers
Living people
1999 births
European Games competitors for Turkey
Competitors at the 2018 Mediterranean Games
Competitors at the 2022 Mediterranean Games
Mediterranean Games gold medalists for Turkey
Mediterranean Games bronze medalists for Turkey
Mediterranean Games medalists in archery
Archers at the 2019 European Games
21st-century Turkish sportswomen
Islamic Solidarity Games medalists in archery